The House of Welf (also Guelf or Guelph) is a European dynasty that has included many German and British monarchs from the 11th to 20th century and Emperor Ivan VI of Russia in the 18th century. The originally Franconian family from the Meuse-Moselle area was closely related to the imperial family of the Carolingians.

Origins
The (Younger) House of Welf is the older branch of the House of Este, a dynasty whose earliest known members lived in Veneto and Lombardy in the late 9th/early 10th century, sometimes called Welf-Este. The first member was Welf I, Duke of Bavaria, also known as Welf IV. He inherited the property of the Elder House of Welf when his maternal uncle Welf III, Duke of Carinthia and Verona, the last male Welf of the Elder House, died in 1055.

Welf IV was the son of Welf III's sister Kunigunde of Altdorf and her husband Albert Azzo II, Margrave of Milan. In 1070, Welf IV became Duke of Bavaria.

Welf II, Duke of Bavaria married Countess Matilda of Tuscany, who died childless and left him her possessions, including Tuscany, Ferrara, Modena, Mantua, and Reggio, which played a role in the Investiture Controversy. Since the Welf dynasty sided with the Pope in this controversy, partisans of the Pope came to be known in Italy as Guelphs (Guelfi).

The first genealogy of the Welfs is the Genealogia Welforum, composed shortly before 1126. A much more detailed history of the dynasty, the Historia Welforum, was composed around 1170. It is the earliest history of a noble house in Germany.

Bavaria and Saxony
Henry IX, Duke of Bavaria, from 1120–1126, was the first of the three dukes of the Welf dynasty called Henry. His wife Wulfhild was the heiress of the house of Billung, possessing the territory around Lüneburg in Lower Saxony. Their son, Henry the Proud, was the son-in-law and heir of Lothair II, Holy Roman Emperor and became also Duke of Saxony on Lothair's death.

Lothair left his territory around Brunswick, inherited from his mother of the Brunonids, to his daughter Gertrud. Her husband Henry the Proud became then the favoured candidate in the imperial election against Conrad III of the Hohenstaufen. Henry lost the election, as the other princes feared his power and temperament, and was dispossessed of his duchies by Conrad III.

Henry's brother Welf VI (1115–1191), Margrave of Tuscany, later left his Swabian territories around Ravensburg, the original possessions of the Elder House of Welf, to his nephew Emperor Frederick I, and thus to the House of Hohenstaufen.

The next duke of the Welf dynasty Henry the Lion (1129/1131–1195) recovered his father's two duchies, Saxony in 1142, Bavaria in 1156 and thus ruled vast parts of Germany.  In 1168 he married Matilda (1156–1189), the daughter of Henry II of England and Eleanor of Aquitaine, and sister of Richard I of England, gaining ever more influence. His first cousin, Frederick I, Holy Roman Emperor of the Hohenstaufen dynasty, tried to get along with him, but when Henry refused to assist him once more in an Italian war campaign, conflict became inevitable.

Dispossessed of his duchies after the Battle of Legnano in 1176 by Emperor Frederick I and the other princes of the German Empire eager to claim parts of his vast territories, he was exiled to the court of his father-in-law Henry II in Normandy in 1180. He returned to Germany three years later.

Henry made his peace with the Hohenstaufen Emperor in 1185 and returned to his much diminished lands around Brunswick without recovering his two duchies. Bavaria had been given to Otto I, Duke of Bavaria, and the Duchy of Saxony was divided between the Archbishop of Cologne, the House of Ascania and others. Diminished lands did not prevent him from imprisoning Richard I on his return from the Third Crusade, and demanding a huge ransom in 1193. Henry died at Brunswick in 1195.

Brunswick and Hanover
Henry the Lion's son, Otto of Brunswick, was elected King of the Romans and crowned Holy Roman Emperor Otto IV after years of further conflicts with the Hohenstaufen emperors. He incurred the wrath of Pope Innocent III and was excommunicated in 1215. Otto was forced to abdicate the imperial throne by the Hohenstaufen Frederick II. He was the only Welf to become Holy Roman Emperor.

 
Henry the Lion's grandson Otto the Child became duke of a part of Saxony in 1235, the new Duchy of Brunswick-Lüneburg, and died there in 1252. The duchy was divided several times during the High Middle Ages amongst various lines of the House of Welf. The subordinate states had the legal status of principalities within the duchy, which remained as an undivided imperial fief. Each state was generally named after the ruler's residence, e.g., the rulers of Brunswick-Wolfenbüttel originally lived in Wolfenbüttel.

Whenever a branch of the family died out in the male line, the territory was given to another line, as the duchy remained enfeoffed to the family as a whole rather than its individual members. All members of the House of Welf, male or female, bore the title Duke/Duchess of Brunswick-Lüneburg in addition to the style of the subordinate principality. By 1705, the subordinate principalities had taken their final form as the Electorate of Hanover and the Principality of Brunswick-Wolfenbüttel, and these would become the Kingdom of Hanover and the Duchy of Brunswick after the Congress of Vienna in 1815.

Principality of Brunswick-Wolfenbüttel
In 1269 the Principality of Brunswick was formed following the first division of the Duchy of Brunswick-Lüneburg. In 1432, as a result of increasing tensions with the townsfolk of Brunswick, the Brunswick Line moved their residence to Wolfenbüttel Castle, thus the name Wolfenbüttel became the unofficial name of this principality. With Ivan VI of Russia the Brunswick line even had a short intermezzo on the Russian imperial throne in 1740. Not until 1754 was the residence moved back to Brunswick, into the new Brunswick Palace. In 1814 the principality became the Duchy of Brunswick, ruled by the senior branch of the House of Welf.

Principality of Calenberg – later Electorate of Brunswick-Lüneburg 

In 1432 the estates gained by the Principality of Brunswick-Wolfenbüttel between the Deister and Leine split away as the Principality of Calenberg. In 1495 it was expanded around Göttingen and in 1584 went back to the Wolfenbüttel Line. In 1634, as a result of inheritance distributions, it went to the House of Luneburg residing at Celle Castle. In 1635 it was given to George, younger brother of Prince Ernest II of Lüneburg, who chose Hanover as his residence.

New territory was added in 1665, and in 1705 the Principality of Luneburg was taken over by the Hanoverians. In 1692 Duke Ernest Augustus from the Calenberg-Hanover Line acquired the right to be a prince-elector of the Holy Roman Empire as the Prince-Elector of Brunswick-Lüneburg. Colloquially the Electorate was known as the Electorate of Hanover. In 1814 it was succeeded by the Kingdom of Hanover.

British succession
Religion-driven politics placed Ernest Augustus's wife Sophia of the Palatinate in the line of succession to the British crown by the Act of Settlement 1701, written to ensure a Protestant succession to the thrones of Scotland and England at a time when anti-Catholic sentiment ran high in much of Northern Europe and Great Britain. Sophia died shortly before her first cousin once removed, Anne, Queen of Great Britain, the last sovereign of the House of Stuart.

Sophia's son George I succeeded Queen Anne and formed a personal union from 1714 between the British crown and the Electorate of Hanover, which lasted until well after the end of the Napoleonic Wars more than a century later, through the dissolution of the Holy Roman Empire and the rise of a new successor kingdom. The British royal family became known as the House of Hanover.

Kingdom of Hanover
The "Electorate of Hanover" (the core duchy) was enlarged with the addition of other lands and became the Kingdom of Hanover in 1814 at the Congress of Vienna. During the first half of the nineteenth century, the Kingdom was ruled as personal union by the British crown from its creation under George III of the United Kingdom, the last elector of Hanover until the death of William IV in 1837.

At that point, the crown of Hanover went to William's younger brother, Ernest Augustus, Duke of Cumberland and Teviotdale under the Salic law requiring the next male heir to inherit, whereas the British throne was inherited by an elder brother's only daughter, Queen Victoria. Her offspring belong to the House of Saxe-Coburg and Gotha: in 1917 the name was changed to the House of Windsor.

The Kingdom of Hanover was lost in 1866 by Ernest Augustus's son George V of Hanover, Austria's ally during the Austro-Prussian War, when it was annexed by Prussia after Austria's defeat and became the Prussian province of Hanover. The Welfs went into exile at Gmunden, Austria, where they built Cumberland Castle.

Brunswick succession
 
The senior line of the dynasty had ruled the much smaller principality of Brunswick-Wolfenbüttel, created the sovereign Duchy of Brunswick in 1814. This line became extinct in 1884. Although the Duchy should have been inherited by the Duke of Cumberland, son of the last king of Hanover, Prussian suspicions of his loyalty led the duchy's throne to remain vacant until 1913, when the Duke of Cumberland's son, Ernst August, married the daughter of Kaiser Wilhelm II and was allowed to inherit it. His rule there was short-lived, as the monarchy came to an end following the First World War in 1918.

The Welf dynasty continues to exist. The last member sitting on a European throne was Frederica of Hanover, Queen of Greece († 1981), mother of Queen Sofia of Spain and King Constantine II of Greece. Frederica's brother Prince George William of Hanover married Princess Sophie of Greece and Denmark, sister of Prince Philip, Duke of Edinburgh. The House's head is Queen Frederica's nephew Ernst August, the third and present husband of Princess Caroline of Monaco.

Rulers of the House of Welf

House of Welf

Partitions under Welf rule

Table of rulers

Family trees

Welf family tree 12th century

Welf family tree 18th century to present

Some direct ancestors (fathers and sons) of the present generation are:
Ernest Augustus, King of Hanover (1771–1851)
George V of Hanover (1819-1878)
Ernest Augustus, Crown Prince of Hanover (1845-1923)
Ernest Augustus, Duke of Brunswick (1887-1953)
Ernest Augustus, Prince of Hanover (1914-1987)
Ernest Augustus, Prince of Hanover (1954-)

See also
Guelph Treasure
Family tree of the German monarchs
Guelph, Ontario

References

External links

 Die Welfen. Official site 
Succession laws in the House of Welf

 

Welf
Welf